In France, Flanders, and the Francophone world, a brasserie is a type of French restaurant with a relaxed setting, which serves single dishes and other meals. The word brasserie is also French for "brewery" and, by extension, "the brewing business". Although most brasseries still serve a large selection of beers, most of them offer a wider choice of beverages such as wines and liquors. A brasserie can be expected to have professional service, printed menus, and, traditionally, white linen—unlike a bistro which may have none of these. Typically, a brasserie is open everyday and serves the same menu, generally composed of a few traditional French dishes, all day. A classic example of a brasserie dish is steak frites.

Etymology

The term brasserie is French for "brewery", from Middle French brasser "to brew", from Old French bracier, from Vulgar Latin braciare, of Celtic origin. Its first usage in English was in 1864.

The origin of the word probably stems from the fact that beer was brewed on the premises rather than brought in: thus an inn would brew its own beer as well as supply food and invariably accommodation too. In 1901 Chambers's Twentieth Century Dictionary of the English Language defined "brasserie" as "in France, any beer-garden or saloon". In 2000 The New Penguin English Dictionary included this definition of "brasserie": "a small informal French-style restaurant".

Famous places 
Among the most renown places considered as a "brasserie", Bouillon Chartier is probable the most emblematic. Located in the 9th arrondissement in Paris, it was opened in 1896 by the two brothers Frédéric et Camille Chartier. Until now, local people as well as tourists visit this very typical place, still decorated in the style of Belle-Epoque to eat traditional and cheap dishes.   

La Closerie des Lilas, located in the 6th arrondissement, opened in 1847 and has seen numerous artists visiting such as Picasso, Jean-Paul Sartre, Oscar Wilde and Aragon for example.   

Other brasseries like Lipp and Café des Capucines also became famous for the clients they have been hosting.

See also
La Mère Catherine (a Parisian brasserie founded in 1793)
 Gastropub
 Bistro
 Cafe
 Restaurant

References 

Restaurants by type
French cuisine